The 2018 Judo Grand Prix Budapest was held at the László Papp Budapest Sports Arena in Budapest, Hungary, from 10 to 12 August 2018.

Medal summary

Men's events

Women's events

Source Results

Medal table

References

External links
 

2018 IJF World Tour
2018 Judo Grand Prix
Judo
Grand Prix 2018
2018 in Hungarian sport
Judo